Juan Pablo Francisco López Pacheco y Moscoso Acuña Manrique Silva Girón y Portocarrero, Grandee of Spain, Duke of Escalona and Lord of Garganta la Olla (Madrid, 22 March 1716 – Madrid  27 April 1751). Member of the Royal Spanish Academy since 10 June 1738, aged 22, becoming the 4th Director of the Royal Spanish Academy in 1746. was promoted to Grandee of Spain, 18 September 1750. Lieutenant General of the Spanish Royal Army, member of the Order of Santiago with several titles of Marquis and Count.

He married on 10 November 1748, aged 36, with Maria Lopez Pacheco de Toledo y Portugal, (Madrid, 22 August 1729 - Madrid, 28 November 1768), 11th Countess of Oropesa, 10th Countess of Alcaudete and many other titles.

He was the son of a second marriage of Mercurio Antonio López Pacheco y Benavides.

1716 births
1751 deaths
Spanish generals
Dukes of Spain
Knights of Santiago
Grandees of Spain
Spanish nobility